Puya meziana is a species in the genus Puya. This species is endemic to Bolivia.

References

meziana
Flora of Bolivia